Qizi may refer to:

Jizi, alternatively spelled Qizi
Qizi, Xiangxiang, Hunan
qızı, an Azerbaijani word meaning 'daughter of', notably used in Azerbaijani names

See also
Oghlu (disambiguation)